In historical linguistics, Bartsch's law or the Bartsch effect (or ) is the name of a sound change that took place in the early history of the langues d'oïl ( 5th - 6th centuries AD), for example in the development of Old French.

Description

Bartsch's law was a phonetic change affecting the open central vowel  in northern Gallo-Romance dialects in the 5th-6th century. This vowel, inherited from Vulgar Latin, underwent fronting and closure in stressed open syllables when preceded by a palatal or palatalized consonant. The result of this process in Old French was the diphthong :

Latin   > Old French laissier  (modern French laisser "let")
Latin   > Old French chier  (modern French cher "dear")
Latin   >  >  > Old French pie  (modern French pied "foot")

According to one view, diphthongization took place first, and Bartsch's law is seen as a further segmentation of the diphthong  caused by the preceding palatal/palatalized consonant, followed by simplification of the resulting triphthong:
IPA:  >  >  >  >  
Romanicist notation: á > áę > íaę > íę > íẹ
IPA:  >  >  
Romanicist notation: a > ẹ > íẹ
Support for the second hypothesis comes the fact that palatal consonants triggered the same change  >  in unstressed word-initial syllables:
Latin   >  > Old French cheval  "horse"

Further development

Subsequent changes have obscured the effects of Bartsch's law in modern French. The accent shifted to the second element of the diphthong , and the first element underwent glide formation:
in IPA:  >  > 
in Romanist notation: íẹ > iẹ́ > yẹ
The glide  was then lost in most words, either absorbed by the preceding palatal consonant, or eliminated by analogical pressure (e.g. in many verbs of the -er conjugation):
Old French chier  >  > modern French cher  "dear"
Old French laissier  >  > modern French laisser  or  "let"

The glide was only retained if subsequent nasalization took place, as in Modern French chien  "dog" (not *chen  or ).

The diphthong  is still visible in the spelling of words like chien "dog" (< ) and moitié "half" (< Proto-Western Romance  < Latin ).

Notes

References

The Phonetic Origin and Phonological Expansion of Gallo-Roman Palatalization, E.Buckley, 2000

Sound laws
Old French
French language